Holmes Island is located in Pine Lake, in Center Township, LaPorte County, just northwest of LaPorte, Indiana. The island is a residential community.

See also
Islands of the Midwest

References

Landforms of LaPorte County, Indiana
Lake islands of Indiana